The 2018–19 DFB-Pokal was the 39th season of the annual German football cup competition. Fifty teams participated in the competition, including all teams from the previous year's Frauen-Bundesliga and the 2. Frauen-Bundesliga, excluding second teams. The competition began on 11 August 2018 with the first of six rounds and ended on 1 May 2019 with the final at the RheinEnergieStadion in Cologne, a nominally neutral venue, which has hosted the final since 2010. The DFB-Pokal is considered the second-most important club title in German women's football after the Bundesliga championship. The DFB-Pokal is run by the German Football Association (DFB).

The defending champions were Frauen-Bundesliga side VfL Wolfsburg, after they defeated Bayern Munich 3–2 on penalties in the previous final.

They successfully defended their title after a 1–0 victory over SC Freiburg.

Participating clubs
The following 50 clubs qualified for the competition:

Format
Clubs from lower leagues will host against clubs from higher leagues until the quarter-finals. Should both clubs play below the 2. Bundesliga, there will be no host club change anymore.

Schedule
The rounds of the 2018–19 competition are scheduled as follows:

Matches
A total of forty-nine matches took place, starting with the first round on 11 August 2018 and culminating with the final on 1 May 2019 at the RheinEnergieStadion in Cologne.

Times up to 27 October 2018 and from 31 March 2019 are CEST (UTC+2). Times from 28 October 2018 to 30 March 2019 are CET (UTC+1).

First round
The eighteen matches were drawn on 12 July and took place on 12 August 2018. The twelve clubs from the 2017–18 Bundesliga season and the two clubs promoted from the 2017–18 2. Bundesliga received a bye.

|}

Second round
The sixteen matches were drawn on 18 August and took place on 8 and 9 September 2018.

|}

Third round
The sixteen matches were drawn on 10 September and took place on 17 and 18 November 2018.

|}

Quarterfinals
The draw was made on 10 February 2019. The matches took place on 12 and 13 March 2019.

|}

Semifinals
The draw was made on 14 March 2019. The matches took place on 31 March 2019.

|}

Final
The final took place on 1 May 2019.

References

Women
2018-19